Cyanoplax  is a genus of chitons in the family Lepidochitonidae.

Species
The following species are recognised in the genus Cyanoplax:
 Cyanoplax beanii  (Carpenter, 1857)
 Cyanoplax berryana (Eernisse, 1986)
 Cyanoplax caverna (Eernisse, 1986)
 Cyanoplax corteziana (Clark, 2000)
 Cyanoplax cryptica Kues, 1974
 Cyanoplax dentiens (Gould, 1846)
 Cyanoplax fernaldi (Eernisse, 1986)
 Cyanoplax hartwegii (Carpenter, 1855)
 Cyanoplax keepiana (Berry, 1948)
 Cyanoplax lowei (Pilsbry, 1918)
 Cyanoplax thomasi (Pilsbry, 1898)

References

Chiton genera